Che' Jones (born April 11, 1971, Columbus, Ohio) is an American basketball coach and retired professional basketball player. He played college basketball at the Ohio State University-Newark, where he ended his career as the second all-time leading scorer in Ohio State University-Newark history having scored 1,693 points. Jones finished his career at Ohio State-Newark second in assists and notched the highest free-throw percentage for a season in the 1999-2000 season with 91.9%. He is also the all-time leader in three-point field goals made, as well as steals. The University retired his jersey (#5) on February 26, 2001. Jones also played professional basketball in Cyprus. Over 20 of his former players have moved on to become professional basketball players, from the NBA to other professional leagues around the world such as Brandon Brown and DeWayne Russell. He is currently in his second year as the head women's basketball coach after spending the previous season as an assistant coach to long time head coach Kristi Kincaid at Phoenix College in Phoenix, Arizona. On March 22, 2014 as an assistant men's coach, the Phoenix College Bears defeated Essex College for the NJCAA DII National Championship. The following season the Bears returned to the NJCAA Final Four losing to eventual national champion Ricahrd Bland (VA) in a double overtime thriller, 87-85 2OT. Prior to coaching at Phoenix College he coached at Northern Arizona University, where he also earned his Master's degree in Higher Education. He was also the associate head coach at Glen Oaks Community College in Centreville, Michigan. Prior to Glen Oaks Community College he was the associate head coach at Albion College, an NCAA division III college in Albion, Michigan. During the 2007-2008 season he was the head assistant coach at Casper College, a junior college in Casper, Wyoming. He just recently was the head basketball coach of the Las Vegas Venom of the American Basketball Association (ABA) and an assistant coach to George Tarkanian son of famed coach Jerry Tarkanian, with the Las Vegas Stars of the IBL (International Basketball League). Che' also coached at Urbana University in Urbana, Ohio. Jones began his coaching career by helping to build Columbus State Community College into a nationally recognized program with longtime friends head coach Anthony Gholson, who is currently the head assistant men's basketball coach at Capital University in Columbus, OH and Anthony Stewart who was the head men's basketball coach at the University of Tennessee-Martin until his tragic death on November 15, 2020.  also at Columbus State University where his team was ranked number one in the country for the entire season and ended their season at 29-2 after losing to the eventual National Champion in the NJCAA Regional Championship game. He is a long time Las Vegas resident.

References

External links
https://www.espn.com/mens-college-basketball/story/_/id/30325893/anthony-stewart-men-basketball-coach-ut-martin-skyhawks-dies
https://web.archive.org/web/20100528014746/http://www2.albion.edu/sports/mens-sports/basketball/coaches/90-mens-basketball-coaches/94-che-jones
http://www.reviewjournal.com/columns-blogs/ron-kantowski/beanpole-las-vegan-rises-above-obstacles
http://www.reviewjournal.com/unlv-sports/ex-rebels-manager-now-nau-coach-gets-rude-welcome

1971 births
Living people
Basketball coaches from Ohio